The K2 is a 2016 South Korean television series starring Ji Chang-wook, Song Yoon-ah and Im Yoon-ah. It premiered on tvN every Friday and Saturday at 20:00 (KST) from September 23 to November 12, 2016 for 16 episodes.

Synopsis
Kim Je-ha (an alias) is a former mercenary soldier for the PMC Blackstone. While in Iraq, he gets framed for the murder of his lover Raniya, a civilian. As a result, he runs away and becomes a fugitive. He returns to South Korea and by chance is offered work as a bodyguard by Choi Yoo-jin, the owner of JSS Security Company and wife of presidential candidate Jang Se-joon. He accepts the job in exchange for resources that he needs to get his revenge on another presidential candidate, Park Kwan-soo, who previously ordered Raniya's killing. Je-ha is assigned to guard Go An-na, the hidden daughter of Jang Se-joon whose life is always threatened because of Yoo-jin, her stepmother. An-na, who has been a recluse and lonely all her life, starts relying on Je-ha, who shows concern for her and protects her at all costs. They slowly fall in love, causing Je-ha to be torn between having to work with his boss, Yoo-jin, to enable him to take revenge on Park Kwan-soo and protecting his newfound love, An-na, against the wishes of Yoo-jin.

Another key figure is Choi Yoo-Jin's half brother, Choi Sung-won, the son of her father's mistress and eventual second wife, who is his half-sister's fierce rival. Plotting with Park Kwan-soo, he eventually causes the deaths of Jang Se-joon and Choi Yoo-jin but later pays for this with his life at the hands of Choi Yoo-Jin's devoted (and ruthless) assistant Kim Dong-mi.  Je-ha achieves his goal of revenge, with Park hanging himself for his atrocious acts and Je-ha clearing his name. The series ends with Je-ha and An-na embracing in a foreign country, with An-na asking Je-ha what his real name is and Je-ha about to reveal it.

Cast

Main
 Ji Chang-wook as Kim Je-ha
 Choi Seung-hoon as young Kim Je-ha
The main protagonist of the series. He is a former Blackstone military operative who had been stationed in Iraq until he flees South Korea after being framed for murder. His skills come to the attention of Choi Yoo-Jin, who hires him to work for her security agency JSS Security under the codename K2, and is assigned as bodyguard to Go An-na's, the secret illegitimate daughter of Choi's husband, Jang Se-joon. The name "Kim Je-ha" is not Je-ha's real name but an alias he uses to conceal his identity while working as An-na's bodyguard; the name actually belongs to a victim of an unsolved missing person case. The real name of the protagonist is unknown throughout the show, except that his real surname is said to be Kim.
 Song Yoon-ah as Choi Yoo-jin
She is the wife of Jang Se-joon.  The eldest daughter of a chaebol family, she was disinherited from the JB Group conglomerate as her father disapproved of a politician as a son-in-law, although she received control of JSS Security. Ambitious and merciless, her corrupt nature is due to the result of her upbringing. She sets her sights on becoming the First Lady and is willing to manipulate An-na and her husband to further her aims. As the series progresses, she begins to develop feelings for Je-ha after he rescues her from an exploding car.
Im Yoon-ah as Go An-na or Anna
 Lee Yoo-joo as young Go An-na
She is the illegitimate daughter of Jang Se-joon who is kept hidden from the public to protect his political career. After her father's affair was discovered, An-na was exiled from Korea and grew up in Spain at a convent, under the constant surveillance of her cruel stepmother Choi Yoo-jin. An-na has developed a social phobia and experiences panic attacks from flashing lights, a result of PTSD stemming from her past connection to the death of her biological mother. She returns to South Korea from Barcelona and becomes a pawn in her stepmother's plan to control her husband's political career from behind-the-scenes. She later falls in love with Je-ha.
 Jo Sung-ha as Jang Se-joon
He is a philandering presidential candidate partially responsible for corrupting his wife. He is also An-na's biological father. Because of An-na, whose existence is unknown to the public, he is unwillingly under the control of his corrupt wife, who blackmails him into doing her bidding. Throughout the series, he doesn't seem to show that he cares for his daughter, but later he reveals to Je-ha that he truly loves her and is willing to submit to his wife just to keep An-na safe.
 Kim Kap-soo as Park Kwan-soo
He is Se-joon's political rival and leader of the current ruling party. He is the main antagonist of the series.

Supporting
 Lee Jung-jin as Choi Sung-won
Yoo-jin's younger half-brother and the current CEO of the chaebol JB Group. Both he and his sister are at odds for the majority control of both JSS Security and their family company. He also constantly tries to get Je-ha to join him, believing him to be a powerful person, but Je-ha continuously refuses due to his loyalty to Yoo-jin, until Sung-won convinces An-na first.
 Shin Dong-mi as Kim Dong-mi 
She is Yoo-jin's personal secretary and right-hand woman. She greatly dislikes Je-ha and attempts to kill him on several occasions. 
 Lee Ye-eun as Jang Mi-ran 
She is one of the personal bodyguards working alongside Je-ha to protect An-na, operating under the codename J4. She had a crush on Je-ha at first, but later accepted Sung-gyu's confession of love. 
 Lee Jae-woo as Kang Sung-gyu 
He is one of the personal bodyguards working alongside Je-ha and Mi-ran to protect An-na, operating under the codename K1. He is in love with Mi-ran, who later reciprocated his feelings. 
 Lee Chul-min as Park Kwan-soo's aide
 Song Kyung-chul as Song Young-chun
 So Hee-jung as Head of JSS medical team
 Jeon Bae-soo as Joo Chul-ho, JH's former commander in Iraq, now JSS mercenary in charge of SJ and YJ's security where he is often known as Chief Joo.

Extended

 Park Soon-chun as Choi Sung-won's mother
 Ko In-beom as Guk Chae-wan
 Lee Soon-won as JSS body guard team leader
 Jo Jae-ryong as Secretary Sung
 Kim Ik-tae as Old man helping Je-ha
 Kwon Soo-hyun as Bodyguard
 Jung Ji-young as Noh Ji-yeon
 Yeom Hye-ran as Housekeeper
 Park Gun
 Yoo In-hyuk as Dong-mi's bodyguard and former baseball player
 Yoon Joo-bin
 Oh Sang-hoon as Battalion captain
 Kim Kyung-ryong as Lee Kyung-jin
 Ji Yoon-jae as Kwan-soo's bodyguard and detective with scar
 Jung Se-hyung as Detective
 Park Kyun-rak as Prosecutor
 Kim Hyun as Helper
 Carson Allen as Raniya

Special appearances

 Joo Sae-byuk as Woman having affair with Jang Se-joon (Ep.1)
 Son Tae-young as Uhm Hye-rin, An-na's mother and a former famous star
 Jo Hee-bong as Police officer
 Sung Dong-il as Police officer (Ep. 3)
 Yoo Seung-mok as Congressman Kim (Ep. 1, 12)
 Lee Han-wi as President's secretary (Ep. 10)
 Jo Dong-hyuk as JSS Special Ops captain (Ep. 8)
 Choi Jung-min
 Park Jung-sang

Production
The drama is written by scriptwriter Jang Hyuk-rin, who wrote Yong-pal (2015) and directed by Kwak Jung-hwan of Neighborhood Hero (2016).

Being depicted with a bodyguard action theme, the drama utilized various fighting techniques including systema, taekwondo, aikido, and jujutsu for its action scenes. It became the first Korean television drama to introduce the Bullet Time effect.

The first script reading was held in August 2016 at the CJ E&M Center in Seoul, South Korea. Filming began in September.

Some scenes of the drama, primarily in episodes 1 and 2, were filmed in Catalonia (along the mountain of Montserrat, the Gothic and Baroque Cistercian Monastery of Santes Creus in Aiguamúrcia), followed by various places in Barcelona (center, Old City, etc., as well as various metro / commuter rail stations such as Plaça d'Espanya and Magòria / La Campana), Gaudí's Modernista Colònia Güell Crypt (fashion show party) among other locations in Spain (probably near Almería for the Iraq War desert locations). The closing scene of episode 16 was filmed at Barcelona's Turó de la Rovira hill. The rest of the series was apparently filmed in Korea.

The male lead Ji Chang-wook, due to his casting, became the highest-paid actor for a tvN drama. He had special training and performed the action stunts in the drama by himself, without a body double. At the press conference, director Kwak expressed "On top of Ji's splendid action, the drama will tell the story of insatiable desire and political fights between people holding secrets of their own."

Original soundtrack

Reception
The drama received favorable reviews, topping cable channel viewership ratings throughout its 8-week broadcast. It was praised by viewers for good performances. The drama currently (2023) streams internationally on Netflix with English subtitles. Its broadcasting rights were sold to Vietnam, Taiwan, Hong Kong, Japan, Singapore, Indonesia, Malaysia, Philippines, China, Thailand, Israel and Greece.

Ratings
In this table,  represent the lowest ratings and  represent the highest ratings.

Awards and nominations

References

External links
 
 
 
 The K2 at Naver Movies 

TVN (South Korean TV channel) television dramas
Korean-language television shows
2016 South Korean television series debuts
South Korean action television series
South Korean political television series
Television series about artificial intelligence
Television series by Studio Dragon
Television series by HB Entertainment